Scott Hiller is a former owner of the Washington Bayhawks. He was the head coach of the Major League Lacrosse's Washington Bayhawks for 2 seasons, and the Boston Cannons for 4 seasons, where he won two coach of the year awards. During his four-year tenure with the Cannons, Hiller compiled a 32-18 regular season record. Hiller began his coaching career as an assistant lacrosse coach at Harvard University from 1991 to 1999.

A 1990 graduate of the University of Massachusetts Amherst, Hiller was a four-time All-America selection for the Minutemen. He was also a member of the United States men's national lacrosse team at the 1994 World Lacrosse Championship, where he won the gold medal. He also serves as a volunteer Assistant Coach for the Northwestern University women's lacrosse team. In addition to his lacrosse experience, Hiller is licensed to practice law in Massachusetts and Illinois, and received his JD from Suffolk University. On September 10, 2016, Hiller was inducted into the UMass Athletic Hall Of Fame.

Awards

References

External links
Northwestern University Bio

American lacrosse players
UMass Minutemen lacrosse players
Major League Lacrosse coaches
Major League Lacrosse major award winners
Harvard Crimson men's lacrosse coaches
Northwestern Wildcats men's lacrosse coaches
Living people
Boston Cannons coaches
Chesapeake Bayhawks coaches
Year of birth missing (living people)
Northwestern Wildcats women's lacrosse coaches
Suffolk University Law School alumni